Coprosma virescens is an endemic New Zealand plant in the genus Coprosma of the family Rubiaceae.
Its Māori name (in common New Zealand usage) is mingimingi, a name which is also applied to closely related species such as C. dumosa, C. rhamnoides, C. propinqua and C. crassifolia. It has very slender, more or less glabrous divaricating branches. The small leaves are petiolate with petioles from 2mm to 5mm long.
The apetalous male flowers occur in axillary clusters of one to two on very short branches. Female flowers are found on their own at the ends of short branchlets.

However, the fruit appears greenish when ripe because of the visible presence of the green seeds within. This feature gives rise to the specific name.

It has a wide distribution, from Masterton southwards on the North Island.

References

virescens
Flora of New Zealand
Divaricating plants